F5U may refer to

 5-FU, technical name of the drug Fluorouracil
 Vought XF5U "Flying Flapjack", experimental U.S. Navy fighter aircraft